Degrassi (season 2) may refer to:

Degrassi Junior High (season 2) airing 1988
Degrassi High (season 2) airing 1990-1991
Degrassi: The Next Generation (season 2), airing 2002–2003, renamed Degrassi in 2010